Svetoslav Velislavov Vutsov (born 9 July 2002) is a Bulgarian professional footballer who plays as a goalkeeper for Slavia Sofia.

He comes from a footballing family, with his grandfather Ivan, father Velislav, mother Svetlana and brother Petar having all played professional football.

Club career
Vutsov began his career as a defender, but around 2015, while being in Levski Sofia Academy, he was switched as a goalkeeper. In 2017 he moved to Tsarsko Selo and trained with the first team. Year later he moved to Septemvri Sofia, before joining Slavia Sofia in the beginning of 2020. He made his professional debut for the team in a league match against Etar in a league match on 21 November 2020, coming as a substitute in the 44th minute, after Georgi Petkov received an injury.

International career
Vutsov received his first call up for Bulgaria U21 team in March 2021 for the friendly tournament matches against Ukraine on 24 March 2021, Kazakhstan on 26 March 2021, and North Macedonia on 29 March 2021.

He made his debut for Bulgaria national football team on 11 November 2021 in a friendly against Ukraine.

Racism controversy 
The Gabonese footballer Gaëtan Missi Mezu claimed in April 2021 that Vutsov had called him a "monkey" during a football match in Bulgaria.

Honours 
Best goalkeeper in Bulgarian football (2021)
Best progressing young player in Bulgarian football (2021)

Career statistics

Club

References

External links

2002 births
Living people
Bulgarian footballers
Association football goalkeepers
Bulgaria international footballers
Bulgaria youth international footballers
Bulgaria under-21 international footballers
First Professional Football League (Bulgaria) players
PFC Slavia Sofia players
Racism in association football